Robert Cram (19 November 1939 – 14 April 2007) was an English professional footballer.

Career

Born in Hetton-le-Hole, County Durham, Cram joined West Bromwich Albion as an amateur in September 1955, at the age of 15. He turned professional in January 1957 but did not make his debut until October 1959 in a 0–0 draw against Bolton Wanderers. He went on to make 163 appearances for The Baggies including the 1966 and 1967 League Cup finals. He was one of the very few defenders to score a hat trick in a top level match v. Stoke City Sept 12th 1964. He is perhaps most remembered for being the captain of the Colchester United team that beat Leeds United in the 1971 FA Cup, one of the greatest shocks in the competition's history. In 1968 he went on loan with the Vancouver Royals in the North American Soccer League. He returned to the NASL in 1974, this time with the Seattle Sounders.

International
In June 1972, Cram was one of five footballers with English League experience pre-selected by Canadian coach Frank Pike for the CONCACAF / FIFA World Cup Qualifiers Germany 1974. Just two months later, however, neither Cram, Bob Lenarduzzi or Les Wilson were available to the Canadian team.

Personal

Cram died in Canada of a heart attack, aged 68, in April 2007. Bobby Cram was also the uncle of athlete Steve Cram.

Honours

Club
West Bromwich Albion 
League Cup Winner 1966
Colchester United
 Watney Cup Winner (1): 1971

References

1939 births
2007 deaths
People from Hetton-le-Hole
Footballers from Tyne and Wear
English footballers
West Bromwich Albion F.C. players
Vancouver Royals players
Eintracht Vancouver players
Colchester United F.C. players
Bath City F.C. players
Seattle Sounders (1974–1983) players
Bromsgrove Rovers F.C. players
North American Soccer League (1968–1984) players
Association football fullbacks
English expatriate sportspeople in the United States
Expatriate soccer players in the United States
English expatriate footballers
English expatriate sportspeople in Canada
Expatriate soccer players in Canada